Sapheneutis is a bagworm genus.

Species
Sapheneutis camerata Meyrick, 1907 (from Sri Lanka)
Sapheneutis certificata Meyrick, 1918 (from South Africa)
Sapheneutis cineracea Meyrick, 1915 (from Taiwan)
Sapheneutis crocotricha Meyrick, 1910 (from India)
Sapheneutis colocynthia Meyrick, 1916 (from India)
Sapheneutis galactodes Meyrick, 1915 (from Malawi)
Sapheneutis galerita Meyrick, 1911 (from India)
Sapheneutis metacentra Meyrick, 1907 (from Sri Lanka)
Sapheneutis pulchella Sobczyk & Schütte, 2010 (from Madagascar)
Sapheneutis terricola Meyrick, 1915 (from Malawi)
Sapheneutis thlipsias Meyrick, 1915 (from Malawi)

References 
Meyrick E. 1907c. Descriptions of Indian Micro-Lepidoptera.V. - Journal of the Bombay natural History Society 18:137–160.
De Prins, J. & De Prins, W. 2015. Afromoths, online database of Afrotropical moth species (Lepidoptera). World Wide Web electronic publication (www.afromoths.net) (28 March 2017)
Markku Savela's ftp.funet.fi

External links 

Psychidae
Psychidae genera